Alice's Wonderland is a 1923 Walt Disney short silent film, produced in Kansas City, Missouri by Laugh-O-Gram Studio. The black-and-white short was the first in a series of Walt Disney's famous Alice Comedies and had a working title of Alice in Slumberland. The film was never shown theatrically, but was instead shown to prospective film distributors.

Plot
Alice (Virginia Davis) visits the Laugh-O-Gram Studio, where the animators (including Walt Disney) show her various scenes on their drawing boards. A few of them: a cat dancing to a cat band; a mouse poking at a cat until it moves; a couple of mice boxing, while the animators crowd around cheering and acting as corner-men. That night, she dreams of taking a train to cartoon-land, where a red carpet reception awaits. She appears in live action. They have a welcoming parade, with Alice riding on an elephant. The cartoons dance for her, and she dances for them. Meanwhile, lions break out of the zoo. The lions chase her into a hollow tree, then into a cave and down a rabbit hole. Finally, she jumps off a cliff and awakes back in her bed. Alice is woken up by her mother, and Alice tells her mother about her strange dream...

In popular culture
The eighth episode of the 2014 Cartoon Network miniseries Over the Garden Wall, entitled "Babes in the Wood", contains several direct visual references to Alice's Wonderland, including the Reception Committee scene.

Home media
The short was released on December 6, 2005, on Walt Disney Treasures: Disney Rarities - Celebrated Shorts: 1920s–1960s.

It was also included as a bonus feature in the Special "Un-Anniversary Edition" of Alice in Wonderland.

References

External links

Alice's Wonderland at The Encyclopedia of Disney Animated Shorts
Laugh-O-Gram Studio

1923 films
1923 short films
1923 animated films
1920s Disney animated short films
American silent short films
American black-and-white films
Films directed by Walt Disney
Films produced by Walt Disney
Films set in Kansas City, Missouri
Films set in studio lots
Alice Comedies
Articles containing video clips
Laugh-O-Gram Studio films
1923 comedy films
Animated films without speech
1920s American films